WBTO-FM (102.3 FM) is a radio station licensed to Petersburg, Indiana, United States.  The station is currently owned by The Original Company, Inc.

History
The station went on the air as WFOV on 1984-06-11. On 1984-07-27, the station changed its call sign to WFPC. On 2001-01-25, its call sign was changed to the current WBTO.

References

External links

BTO-FM